Irving Adrián Pérez Pineda (born 16 May 1986) is a Mexican triathlete. He competed in the men's event at the 2016 Summer Olympics held in Rio de Janeiro, Brazil. In 2021, he competed in the men's triathlon at the 2020 Summer Olympics held in Tokyo, Japan.

See also
 List of people from Morelos, Mexico

References

External links
 

1986 births
Living people
Mexican male triathletes
Olympic triathletes of Mexico
Triathletes at the 2016 Summer Olympics
Triathletes at the 2020 Summer Olympics
Pan American Games medalists in triathlon
Pan American Games bronze medalists for Mexico
Triathletes at the 2015 Pan American Games
Triathletes at the 2019 Pan American Games
Sportspeople from Morelos
Medalists at the 2019 Pan American Games
Medalists at the 2015 Pan American Games